Bernard Lewis (1899-1993) was a major figure in the field of combustion and a founding member of The Combustion Institute.

Biography 
Lewis was born in London and immigrated to United States when he was a child. He was awarded a degree in chemical engineering from Massachusetts Institute of Technology in 1923 and a master's degree from Harvard University in 1924. He received his PhD degree from University of Cambridge in 1926. He joined as a physical chemist at U.S. Bureau of Mines in 1929 and retired in 1953. He then started the Combustion and Explosives Research, Inc. and served as a President until 1986. The Combustion Institute awards a gold medal  and a fellowship biennially in honor of Bernard Lewis.

Books

References 

1993 deaths
Fluid dynamicists
MIT School of Engineering alumni
Alumni of the University of Cambridge
Harvard University alumni
1899 births
British emigrants to the United States